The Abarth 1500 Biposto was an experimental coupe designed by Franco Scaglione, who worked for Bertone at the time. It was displayed at the 1952 Turin Motor Show. Following the Turin Show, it was purchased by Packard and brought to Detroit, where it was used for design inspiration.

The Biposto was given to motoring journalist Dick Smith in mid-1953 as his prize for suggesting a new Packard advertising slogan. Smith sparingly drove the car for two decades, before putting it into storage. It did not reappear until put up for auction in 2003 where it was acquired by historic racer, car collector and restorer Chris M Drake

It features a futuristic design consisting of a central headlight, similar to the earlier Tucker Torpedo, and fins in the rear. The design is believed to have paved the way for the Alfa Romeo BAT series of concept cars.

Unveiled after a 7-year restoration by Chris M Drake, It won the prestigious Gran Turismo Trophy at the 2010 Pebble Beach Concours d'Elegance and is featured in Gran Turismo 6 and Gran Turismo Sport.  The car also won Best in Class at the prestigious Amelia Island Concours in March 2011 and also was shown at the Goodwood Cartier "Style Et Luxe" later that year.

References 
https://web.archive.org/web/20110721102318/http://www.rickcarey.com/Catalog%20Descriptions/Abarth%20Biposto/AbarthBiposto.htm
https://web.archive.org/web/20101029231759/http://us.gran-turismo.com/us/news/d5305.html

1500
One-off cars
Concept cars
1950s cars